Atlantis is an archaeological adventure novel by David Gibbins. First published in 2005, it is the first book in Gibbins's Jack Howard series. It has been published in 30 languages and has sold over a million copies, and is the basis for a TV miniseries currently in development.

Sequel

David Gibbins's sixth novel in the Jack Howard series, The Gods of Atlantis, published by Headline in 2011, is a sequel to Atlantis.

References

External links
 David Gibbins's website

2005 British novels
British adventure novels
British thriller novels
Atlantis in fiction
Archaeology in popular culture
Headline Publishing Group books